Events from the year 2007 in the United States.

Incumbents

Federal government 
 President: George W. Bush (R-Texas)
 Vice President: Dick Cheney (R-Wyoming)
 Chief Justice: John Roberts (New York)
 Speaker of the House of Representatives: Dennis Hastert (R-Illinois) (until January 3), Nancy Pelosi (D-California) (starting January 4)
 Senate Majority Leader: Bill Frist (R-Tennessee) (until January 3), Harry Reid (D–Nevada) (starting January 3)
 Congress: 109th (until January 3), 110th (starting January 3)

Events

January 

 January 4
 William J. Fallon succeeds Gen. John Abizaid as the head of Central Command in Iraq.
 Nancy Pelosi becomes the first female Speaker of the United States House of Representatives.
 January 9
War in Somalia: U.S. warplanes conduct air strikes in Somalia against suspected terrorists.
 Steve Jobs publicly announces the release of the first iPhone.
 January 10 – The Iraq War troop surge begins. 
 January 12 – The U.S. Embassy in Athens is attacked with a rocket propelled grenade, which causes minimal damage and no injuries.
 January 23 – George W. Bush delivers his sixth State of the Union Address.
 January 28 – A battle between insurgents and U.S.-backed Iraqi troops kills 300 suspected resistance members in Najaf, Iraq.
 January 30 
Microsoft releases Windows Vista and Office 2007.
A convenience store in Ghent, West Virginia, explodes due to a propane leak, killing four people and injuring several others.
 January 31
 Delta Air Lines creditors officially reject US Airways' hostile takeover bid.
 The Mooninite scare occurs in Boston when devices used in a guerrilla marketing campaign for the animated television series Aqua Teen Hunger Force are mistaken for improvised explosive devices.

February 
 February 2 – An unseasonal tornado in central Florida kills 21 people.
 February 10 – Senator Barack Obama of Illinois declares his candidacy for President of the United States of America.
 February 12 – Gunman Sulejman Talović shoots and kills five people at the Trolley Square Mall in Salt Lake City, Utah, before being killed by the police, bringing the evening's rampage death toll to six. 
 February 25 – The 79th Academy Awards ceremony, hosted by Ellen DeGeneres, is held at Kodak Theatre in Hollywood. Martin Scorsese's The Departed wins four awards, including Best Picture and Best Director. Bill Condon's Dreamgirls leads the nominations with eight. The telecast garners over 39.9 million viewers.
 February 27 – 2007 Bagram Air Base bombing: A Taliban suicide attack at Bagram Air Base while Vice President of the United States Dick Cheney is visiting kills 23, but he is not injured.
 February 28 – The New Horizons space probe makes a gravitational slingshot against Jupiter which changes its trajectory towards Pluto.

March 
 March 6 – Mega Millions sets a new world record for the highest lottery jackpot of $370 million.
 March 15 – Rebecca Klein is murdered in Villa Park, Illinois by her domestic partner Nicole Abusharif. Klein was bound and suffocated, with the perpetrator standing to benefit from a life insurance payout as a result of the crime.
 March 16 – For the first time in the 23-year history of the modern version of the popular gameshow, Jeopardy!, a three-way tie occurs.
 March 23 – Walt Disney Animation Studios' 47th feature film, Meet the Robinsons, is released to the studio's strongest reception since 2002's Treasure Planet, but is a box office disappointment. 
 March 84 – Lynn Turner is convicted of murdering her second husband, Randy Thompson, by poisoning with antifreeze. Turner had been previously convicted of murdering her first husband using the same method.

April 

 April 1 – World Wrestling Entertainment holds WrestleMania 23 in Detroit, Michigan.
 April 16 – Thirty-two people are killed in the Virginia Tech massacre at the Virginia Polytechnic Institute and State University in Blacksburg, Virginia. Gunman Seung-Hui Cho is able to buy his firearms legally, despite having a record of mental illness, causing a large national debate on guns. 
 April 19 – U.S. and allied air forces conduct massive exercises over South Korea with over 500 planes.
 April 25
 The Dow Jones Industrial Average gains 135.95 points to close at 13089.89; its first close above 13000 in its history.
 The Burj Khalifa in Dubai reaches the height of the Sears Tower on its way to becoming the tallest building in the world.
 Congressman Dennis Kucinich introduces articles to impeach Vice President Dick Cheney.
 President George W. Bush announces the U.S. will increase efforts to combat malaria in Africa.

May 
 May 3 – The U.S. House of Representatives passes the Matthew Shepard Act. It is the first time that the House brings a gay rights bill to the floor for a vote.
 May 4
Tornadoes strike Greensburg, Kansas, killing at least 12 people and destroying about 90% of the town.
Spider-Man 3 is released in theaters.
 Executive Directive 51, which specifies the procedures for continuity of the federal government in the event of a "catastrophic emergency," is signed by President George W. Bush.
 May 9 – Subtropical Storm Andrea forms off the coast of Florida, the earliest since Subtropical Storm Ana in 2003.
 May 31 – A calendar blue moon occurs in the Western Hemisphere and parts of the Eastern Hemisphere.

June 
 June 1 – U.S. warships bombard a Somali village where Islamic militants had set up a base.
 June 2 – Four people are charged with a terror plot to blow up JFK International Airport in New York City.
 June 3 – The Valley of Geysers in Russia was destroyed by a mudflow.
 June 4 – Ten people, including a Californian National Guard officer and former Hmong general, are charged over plans to overthrow the Laotian Government.
 June 5 – NASA's MESSENGER spacecraft made its second fly-by of Venus en route to Mercury.
June 8 – The Space Shuttle Atlantis successfully launches on mission STS-117.
 June 10 – The Sopranos ended with the infamous cut to black ending.
 June 14 – The San Antonio Spurs sweep the Cleveland Cavaliers to win the 2007 NBA Finals.
 June 15 – The Price Is Right airs its final episode hosted by Bob Barker .
 June 16 – Mike Nifong, district attorney for Durham County, North Carolina, is disbarred for misconduct, having been found guilty of 27 ethics related charges. Nifong withheld evidence that cleared the falsely accused players in the Duke lacrosse case.
 June 18 – Nine Charleston, South Carolina firefighters are killed by a roof collapse while battling the Charleston Sofa Super Store fire.
 June 24 – In South Lake Tahoe, California, a wildfire destroys 254 homes in the area.
 June 25
 WWE wrestler Chris Benoit, his wife Nancy Benoit, and son Daniel, are found dead as the result of a murder-suicide that took place over the previous weekend.
 Groundbreaking begins on the Chicago Spire.
 June 29 
 The first iPhone is released for sale in the U.S.
 Pixar Animation Studios' eighth feature film, Ratatouille, is released in theaters.
 June 30 – The Hawaii Superferry arrives in Honolulu after a 7,600 mile journey from Mobile, Alabama.

July 

 July 7
 Venus Williams wins the Women's Singles at Wimbledon for a fourth time.
 Live Earth Concerts are held throughout 9 major cities around the world.
 July 8 – Boeing launches the new Boeing 787.
 July 10 – A Cessna 310R twin-engine airplane crashes into two homes in Sanford, Florida, killing three adults and two children.
 July 15 – In Tacoma, Washington, the second span of the Tacoma Narrows Bridge opens to traffic, making it the longest twin suspension bridge in the world.
 July 18 – At the height of rush hour in New York City, a major steam pipe bursts, releasing millions of gallons of boiling water and super heated steam. Only one fatality occurred; a pedestrian who went into cardiac arrest.
 July 19 – The Dow Jones Industrial Average closes above 14,000 for the first time in history.
 July 21 – Vice President Dick Cheney serves as acting president for a few hours while President George W. Bush undergoes a colonoscopy procedure under sedation.
 July 23 – The Cheshire Murders - On July 23, 2007, Linda Hayes and Joshua Komisarjevsky invaded the residence of the Petit family in Cheshire, Connecticut. Though initially planning only to rob the house, she and Komisarjevsky murdered Jennifer Hawke-Petit and her two daughters, 17-year-old Hayley Petit and 11-year-old Michaela Petit.
 July 27 – Transformers, directed by Michael Bay, is released as the first film in the Transformers film series.
 July 31 – For the United States Army, the role of AIT Platoon Sergeant is initiated.

August 

 August 1
 The I-35W Mississippi River bridge on Interstate 35W over the Mississippi River in Minneapolis, Minnesota between University Avenue and Washington Avenue collapses at 6:05 p.m. CST during the later part of rush hour, killing 13 people.
 Scouting celebrates its 100th birthday with worldwide celebrations.
 August 4 – The Phoenix spacecraft launches toward the Martian north pole.
 August 6 – The Crandall Canyon Mine in Emery County, Utah collapses, trapping six miners.
 August 7 – Barry Bonds breaks Hank Aaron's home run record by hitting his 756th home run.
 August 8 – The Space Shuttle Endeavour is successfully launched on mission STS–118.
 August 9 – The Dow Jones Industrial Average loses 387.18 points, its largest single-day drop since February 27.
 August 12 – Tiger Woods wins PGA Championship, his 13th career major.
 August 15 – NBA referee Tim Donaghy surrenders to police and pleads guilty to charges brought up by the FBI investigation that he placed bets on games that he refereed.
 August 16 – The Crandall Canyon Mine in Emery County, Utah, collapses a second time, killing three rescue workers and injuring six more.
 August 17 – Phineas and Ferb debuts on Disney Channel.
 August 18 – The remnants of Tropical Storm Erin re-strengthen into a tropical storm over Oklahoma, causing widespread flooding and wind damage.
 August 21 – STS–118 lands at the Kennedy Space Center, completing Space Shuttle Endeavour's 19th flight.
 August 22 – The Texas Rangers score thirty runs in one game, setting the modern (post–1900) MLB record for most runs by one team in a single game, in a 30–3 victory over the Baltimore Orioles.
 August 27 – United States Attorney General Alberto Gonzales announces his resignation, to be effective September 17.
 August 30 – 2007 United States Air Force nuclear weapons incident in which a B–52 flew from Minot AFB, North Dakota to Barksdale AFB, Louisiana carrying 6 nuclear warheads.

September 
 September 3
 WordGirl debuts on PBS KIDS GO!.
 Super Why! and WordWorld debuts on PBS Kids.
 September 8 – iCarly debuts on Nickelodeon.
 September 15 – Over 3,000 Taiwanese Americans and their supporters rally in front of the UN in New York City to demand that the UN accept Taiwan. At the same time, over 300,000 Taiwanese people rally in Taiwan to make the same plea.
 September 24
 Oregon State University Mars Rover student-organized project is formed.
 The Big Bang Theory debuts on CBS.
 September 25 – Halo 3 is released on Xbox 360, breaking all previous records in entertainment history by generating $170 million in the first 24 hours of release.

 October 

 October 7 – Off-duty police officer Tyler Peterson kills six people at a house party in Crandon, Wisconsin before committing suicide.
 October 9 – The Dow Jones Industrial Average hits an all-time high of 14,164 before beginning to decline ahead of the start of the late–2000s recession.
 October 10 – The SuccessTech Academy school shooting occurs in Cleveland, Ohio.
 October 15 – Drew Carey debuts as host of The Price Is Right, replacing the retired Bob Barker.
 October 18 – In New York City, one of the world's leading art galleries, the Salander/O'Reilly Galleries, is forced into closure amidst scandal and lawsuits.
 October 20 – Georgia's governor Sonny Perdue declares a state of emergency due to drought conditions.
 October 20-November 9 – Wildfires in Southern California result in the evacuation of more than 1,000,000 people and destroys over 1,600 homes and businesses.
 October 22 – In Missouri, Lisa Montgomery is convicted of murdering pregnant woman Bobbie Jo Stinnett and cutting her baby from her womb.
 October 26 – Apple Inc. launches the sixth major release of their Mac OS X operating system, Mac OS X 10.5 Leopard.
 October 28 – The Boston Red Sox win the 2007 World Series in a four-game sweep against the Colorado Rockies.
 October 31 – The World Economic Forum releases the Global Competitiveness Report 2007–2008.

 November 
November 1 – GoAnimate, now Vyond, is founded by Alvin Hung.
November 3 
 DARPA Grand Challenge, a prized competition for driverless cars to navigate safely in traffic, is scheduled.
 Navy breaks its 43-year losing streak against Notre Dame in overtime, ending the streak of the most consecutive NCAA football wins over one opponent.
November 4 – Daylight saving time in the United States and most of Canada will end, one week later than the previous schedule, in accordance with the Energy Policy Act of 2005.
November 5 – The Writers Guild of America goes on strike.
November 6 – Legislative elections are held in the U.S. states of Kentucky, Mississippi, New Jersey, and Virginia; Kentucky and Mississippi also hold gubernatorial elections.
November 8 – The 8th annual Latin Grammy Awards are held at the Mandalay Bay Events Center at Mandalay Bay in Las Vegas.
November 27 – The Annapolis Conference, a peace conference trying to end the Arab–Israeli conflict, is held in Annapolis, Maryland.
November 30 – The 2007 Atlantic Hurricane Season officially ends.

 December 
 December
 The National Intelligence Estimate (NIE) controversially expresses "high confidence" that Iran's nuclear weapons program has not operated since 2003.
 The late-2000s recession officially begins; unemployment rate is 5%. 
 December 3 – Winter storms bring record amounts of rainfall in the Pacific Northwest, causing flooding and closing a 20-mile portion of Interstate 5 for several days. At least eight deaths and billions of dollars in damages occur in Washington.
 December 4 – The United States Senate approves the Peru Free Trade Agreement.
 December 5 – Robert A. Hawkins shoots eight people dead and injures five at the Westroads Mall in Omaha, Nebraska, then commits suicide.
 December 9 – Matthew Murray goes on a killing spree targeting Christians in Colorado. Murray kills four before being shot by an off-duty police officer. He then commits suicide.
 December 13 – Former U.S. Senator George J. Mitchell publicly releases a report, accusing 89 retired and active Major League Baseball players of anabolic steroid use.
 December 19 – An explosion and fire at the T2 Laboratories facility in Jacksonville, Florida kills four and injures 14.
 December 20
 In the race for the Republican presidential nomination, Tom Tancredo withdraws and endorses Mitt Romney.
 A group of activist Lakota people send a letter to the United States State Department, declaring their secession from the Union as the Republic of Lakotah.
 December 25 – An escaped tiger kills one person and injures two others at the San Francisco Zoo.

 Ongoing 
 War in Afghanistan (2001–2021)
 Iraq War (2003–2011)
 Late-2000s recession (2007–2009)

 Undated 
Air Education Training Command Collaboration Portal is founded.
Bidtopia, an e-commerce site is founded.
Imedexchange, a private online community for M.D.s and D.O.s is founded. 
Latin Jam Workout, a Latin dance fitness program is founded in Los Angeles, California.
MarinAire company based in Miami, Florida is founded.
Russian Chamber Music Foundation of Seattle is founded.
Streets International, a non-profit corporation is formed in New York.
T3 Live, online financial media network and educational platform, is founded.Redler, Scott and Sean Hendelman. The Modern Trader: Wall Street Traders Reveal Their Formula for Success. NY: Marketplace Books (May 17, 2011).
You Walk Away, a San Diego, California company is formed.

 Births 

 February 1 – Jeanette Pizano, amazing person
 February 7 – Jason Liang, chess master
 February 9 – Zaila Avant-garde, first African-American winner of the Scripps National Spelling Bee
 March 4 – Miya Cech, actress
 March 25 – Cailey Fleming, actress
 May 26 – Adam Toledo, notable victim of a police shooting (d. 2021)
 June 6 – Aubrey Anderson-Emmons, actress
 June 23 
 Desmond Napoles, drag performer 
 Elliana Kathryn Walmsley, dancer
 July 3 – Keedron Bryant, singer
 July 6 – Amariyanna Copeny, activist
 July 14 – Darby Camp, actress
 July 17 – Charlie Shotwell, actor
 July 18 – JD McCrary, singer, dancer, actor
 July 27 – Alyvia Alyn Lind, actress, daughter of actress Barbara Alyn Woods
 July 31 – Angelica Hale, singer
 August 16 – Seth Carr, actor
 September 12 – Zackary Arthur, actor
 October 22 – Izaac Wang, actor
 November 3 – Ever Anderson, actress, daughter of actress Milla Jovovich and director Paul W. S. Anderson
 November 23 – Lonnie Chavis, actor
 November 4 – Angela Frausto, editor 
 December 4 – Scarlett Estevez, actress

 Deaths 
 January 

 January 1
 Ernie Koy, baseball player (b. 1909)
 Darrent Williams, American football player and murder victim (b. 1982)
 Julius Hegyi, conductor (b. 1923)
 Tad Jones, music historian (b. 1952) (injuries from a fall)
 Del Reeves, country singer (b. 1932)
 January 2 – Robert C. Solomon, philosopher, author, and academic (b. 1942)
 January 4 
 Steve Krantz, film producer (b. 1923)
 Bob Milliken, baseball player (b. 1926)
 January 6 – Mario Danelo, college football player (b. 1985)
 January 7 – Bobby Hamilton, race car driver (b. 1957)
 January 8 
 Yvonne de Carlo, Canadian-born American actress (b. 1922)
 Iwao Takamoto, animator, television producer, and film director (b. 1925) 
 January 11 – Robert Anton Wilson, writer, philosopher, psychologist, editor, and poet (b. 1932)
 January 12 – Alice Coltrane, musician and composer (b. 1937)
 January 13 – Michael Brecker, musician and composer (b. 1949)
 January 14 – Darlene Conley, actress (b. 1934)
 January 16 – Benny Parsons, race car driver and television announcer and analyst (b. 1941)
 January 17 – Art Buchwald, humorist (b. 1925)
 January 19 
 Bam Bam Bigelow, wrestler (b. 1961)
 Dennis Doherty, member of The Mamas and The Papas b. 1940
 January 20 – Dan Christensen, painter (b. 1942)
 January 22 – Liz Renay, actress (b. 1926)
 January 23 
 E. Howard Hunt, intelligence officer (b. 1918)
 Disco D, producer and DJ (b. 1980)
 January 25 – Charlotte Reid, singer and politician (b. 1913)
 January 27 
 Tige Andrews, actor (b. 1920)
 Marcheline Bertrand, actress and humanitarian (b. 1950) 
 January 28 – Emma Tillman, supercentenarian (b. 1892)
 January 30 – Sidney Sheldon, writer and screenwriter (b. 1917)
 January 31
 Lee Bergere, actor (b. 1918)
 Molly Ivins, columnist, political commentator, humorist, and writer (b. 1944)

 February 

 February 1 
 Ray Berres, baseball player (b. 1907)
 Emery Bopp, artist and art teacher (b. 1924)
 February 2 – Eric Von Schmidt, folk musician (b. 1931)
 February 4 
 Steve Barber, baseball player (b. 1937)
 Barbara McNair, actress (b. 1934)
 February 6 
 Frankie Laine, singer, songwriter, and actor (b. 1913)
 Willye White, Olympic track and field athlete (b. 1939)
 February 7
 Tommy James, football player (b. 1923)
 Ken Kennedy, computer scientist (b. 1945)
 Josephine Lenard, baseball player (b. 1921)
 February 8 
 Joe Edwards, comic book artist (b. 1921)
 Anna Nicole Smith, model, actress, television personality and notable United States Supreme Court litigant (b. 1967)
 Harriett Woods, politician (b. 1927)
 February 9 – Hank Bauer, baseball player and manager (b. 1922)
 February 10 – Cardis Cardell Willis, comic (b. 1937)
 February 11 – Charles Langford, politician (b. 1922)
 February 12 – Peggy Gilbert, bandleader (b. 1905)
 February 13 
 Bruce M. Metzger, biblical scholar (b. 1914)
 Charlie Norwood politician (b. 1941)
 February 15 – Walker Edmiston, actor (b. 1925)
 February 16 – Gene Snyder, politician (b. 1928)
 February 17 – Mike Awesome, wrestler (b. 1965)
 February 18 
 Barbara Gittings, LGBT activist (b. 1932)
 Bob Oksner, comic book artist (b. 1916)
 February 19 – Janet Blair, big-band singer (b. 1921)
 February 22 
 Avrohom Blumenkrantz, Orthodox rabbi (b. 1944)
 Dennis Johnson, basketball player (b. 1954)
 February 23 – Donnie Brooks, pop singer (b. 1935)
 February 24 
 Bruce Bennett, actor and athlete (b. 1906)
 Leroy Jenkins, composer (b. 1932)  
 February 25 – William Anderson, American naval officer and politician (b. 1921)
 February 27 – Elbie Nickel, American Football player (b. 1922)
 February 28 
 Robert Kingston, army general (b. 1928)
 Arthur M. Schlesinger Jr., historian and political commentator (b. 1917)

 March 

 March 4
 Thomas Eagleton, politician (b. 1929)
 Bob Hattoy, activist (b. 1950)
 March 6 – Allen Coage, professional wrestler (b. 1943)
 March 8 – Christopher Barrios Jr., murder victim (b. 2001)
 March 9 – Brad Delp, singer (Boston) (b. 1951)
 March 10
 Ernie Ladd, American football player and professional wrestler (b. 1938)
 Richard Jeni, stand-up comedian (b. 1957)
 March 11 – Betty Hutton, actress (b. 1921)
 March 19 – Calvert DeForest, actor and comedian (b. 1921)
 March 20 – Gilbert E. Patterson, American bishop (b. 1939)
 March 23 – Eric Medlen, American race car driver (b. 1973)
 March 28
 Abe Coleman, Polish-born American wrestler (b. 1905)
 Bill Fisk, American football player and coach (b. 1916)
 Tony Scott, American musician (b. 1921)

 April 

 April 3 – Eddie Robinson, American football coach (b. 1919)
 April 4 – Bob Clark, film director (b. 1939)
 April 5
 Mark St. John, guitarist (b. 1956) 
 Thomas Stoltz Harvey pathologist who conducted Albert Einstein's autopsy (b. 1912)
 Darryl Stingley, American football player (b. 1951)
 April 7
 Johnny Hart, cartoonist (b. 1931)
 Barry Nelson, actor (b. 1917)
 April 11
 Roscoe Lee Browne, actor (b. 1922)
 Ronald Speirs, United States Army officer (b. 1920)
 Kurt Vonnegut, novelist and playwright (b. 1922)
 April 14 – Don Ho, musician (b. 1930)
 April 17 – Kitty Carlisle, singer, actress & talk show panelist (b. 1910)
 April 22 – Juanita Millender-McDonald, politician (b. 1938)
 April 23 – David Halberstam, journalist and historian (b. 1934)
 April 26 – Jack Valenti, American film executive, creator of MPAA film rating system (b. 1921)
 April 28 – Dabbs Greer, American actor (b. 1917)
 April 30
 Tom Poston, actor (b. 1921)
 Gordon Scott, actor (b. 1926)

 May 

 May 3 – Wally Schirra, astronaut (b. 1923)
 May 5 – Theodore Maiman, physicist (b. 1927)
 May 9 – Edith Rodriguez, medical patient (b. 1964)
 May 12 – Teddy Infuhr, actor (b. 1936)
 May 15
 Jerry Falwell, evangelist (b. 1933)
 Yolanda King, actress and activist, daughter of Martin Luther King Jr. (b. 1955)
 May 17 – Lloyd Alexander, author (b. 1924)
 May 20 – Stanley Miller, chemist and biologist (b. 1930)
 May 25 – Charles Nelson Reilly, actor, comedian, and director (b. 1931)
 May 28
 Marquise Hill, American football player (b. 1982)
 David Lane, white nationalist (b. 1938)

 June 

 June 1 – Arn Shein, journalist (b. 1928)
 June 4 – Craig L. Thomas, American politician (b. 1933)
 June 11 – Mala Powers, American film actress (b. 1931)
 June 12 – Don Herbert, American television personality, Mr. Wizard (b. 1917)
 June 14 – Ruth Bell Graham, Wife of Billy Graham (b. 1920)
 June 15 – Sherri Martel, American professional wrestler (b. 1958)
 June 22 – Nancy Benoit, wrestling valet and manager, and wife and murder victim of Chris Benoit (b. 1964)
 June 23 – Rod Beck, baseball player (b. 1968)
 June 24 – Chris Benoit, Canadian wrestler, and husband and murderer of Nancy Benoit (b. 1967)

 July 
 July 2
 Beverly Sills, operatic soprano (b. 1929)
 Hy Zaret, lyricist and composer (b. 1907)
 July 3 – Boots Randolph, saxophone player (b. 1927)
 July 4
 Johnny Frigo, jazz violinist and bassist (b. 1916)
 Bill Pinkney, singer (b. 1925)
 July 9 – Charles Lane, actor (b. 1905)
 July 11
 Lady Bird Johnson, wife of Lyndon B. Johnson, First Lady of the United States, Second Lady of the United States (b. 1912)
 Shag Crawford, umpire in Major League Baseball (b. 1916)
 July 20 – Tammy Faye Messner, televangelist (b. 1942)  
 July 22 – László Kovács, Hungarian-American cinematographer (b. 1933)
 July 23 – Benjamin Libet, pioneering scientist in the field of human consciousness (b. 1916)
 July 24
 Albert Ellis, psychologist (b. 1913)
 Riley Ann Sawyers, murder victim (b. 2005)
 July 29 – Tom Snyder, talk show host (b. 1936)
 July 30 – Bill Walsh, American football coach (b. 1931)

 August 

 August 5 – Oliver Hill, lawyer (b. 1907)
 August 12 – Merv Griffin, singer, television producer and land developer (b. 1925)
 August 13
 Brooke Astor, socialite and philanthropist (b. 1902)
 Phil Rizzuto, baseball player and announcer (b. 1917)
 August 15 – John Gofman, American Manhattan Project scientist and advocate (b. 1918)
 August 16 – Max Roach, American percussionist, drummer, and composer (b. 1924)
 August 17 – Eddie Griffin, American basketball player (b. 1982)
 August 18 – Michael Deaver, American political adviser (b. 1938)
 August 20 – Leona Helmsley, American hotel operator and real estate investor (b. 1920)
 August 29 – Richard Jewell, American falsely accused of bombing the Centennial Olympic Park (b. 1962)

 September 

 September 2 – Marcia Mae Jones, actress (b. 1924)
 September 3 – Steve Fossett, businessman, aviator, and sailer, missing person declared-dead in absentia'' (b. 1944)
 September 10 – Jane Wyman, American actress, first wife of Ronald Reagan (b. 1917)
 September 15 – Brett Somers, American actress (b. 1924)
 September 20 – Mahlon Clark, American musician (b. 1923)
 September 21
 Neveah Gallegos, murder victim (b. 2004)
 Alice Ghostley, American actress (b. 1926)
 Rex Humbard, evangelist (b. 1919)

October 

 October 1 – Al Oerter, athlete (b. 1936)
 October 6 – Jo Ann Davis, politician (b. 1950)
 October 11 – Sri Chinmoy, Indian philosopher (b. 1931)
 October 14 – Big Moe, rapper (b. 1974)
 October 17
 Joey Bishop, entertainer (b. 1918)
 Teresa Brewer, singer (b. 1931)
 Suzy Covey, scholar (b. 1939)
 October 18 – William J. Crowe, military commander and ambassador (b. 1925)
 October 26
 Friedman Paul Erhardt, German-American television chef (b. 1943)
 Arthur Kornberg, biochemist (b. 1918)
 October 28 – Porter Wagoner, country singer (b. 1927)
 October 30 
 Robert Goulet, entertainer (b. 1933)
 John Woodruff, athlete (b. 1915)

November 

 November 1 – Paul Tibbets, pilot of the Enola Gay (b. 1915)
 November 2 – The Fabulous Moolah, professional wrestler (b. 1923)
 November 3 – Ryan Shay, runner (b. 1979)
 November 6 – Hank Thompson, country singer (b. 1925)
 November 10
 Laraine Day, actress (b. 1920)
 Augustus F. Hawkins, politician and civil rights lawmaker (b. 1907)
 Norman Mailer, writer (b. 1923)
 November 11 – Delbert Mann, film and television director (b. 1920)
 November 12 – Ira Levin, novelist (b. 1929)
 November 15 – Joe Nuxhall, baseball player and announcer (b. 1928)
 November 16 – Harold Alfond, businessman (b. 1914)
 November 18 – Sidney Coleman, theoretical physicist (b. 1937) 
 November 19 – Kevin DuBrow, musician (Quiet Riot) (b. 1955)  
 November 24 – Casey Calvert, musician (Hawthorne Heights) (b. 1981)
 November 25 – Kevin DuBrow, musician (Quiet Riot) (b. 1955) 
 November 27
 Sean Taylor, American football player (b. 1983)
 Robert Cade, American physician and inventor of the beverage Gatorade (b. 1927)
 Bill Willis, American football player (b. 1921)
 November 29
 Henry Hyde, politician (b. 1924)
 Roger Bonham Smith, businessman (b. 1925)
 November 30 – Evel Knievel, motorcycle daredevil (b. 1938)

December 

 December 2
 Robert O. Anderson, businessman (b. 1917)
 Elizabeth Hardwick, literary critic and novelist (b. 1916)
 December 4
 Pimp C, rapper (b. 1973)
 Chip Reese, professional gambler (b. 1951)
 December 12
 Shawn Eckardt, bodyguard and businessman (b. 1967)
 Ike Turner, musician (b. 1931)
 December 13 – Floyd Westerman, actor and activist (b. 1936)
 December 15 – Julia Carson, politician (b. 1938)
 December 16 – Dan Fogelberg, singer and songwriter (b. 1951) 
 December 18 – Bill Strauss, satirist, author and historian (b. 1947)
 December 21
 Carol Bly, Teacher, award-winning author of short stories, essays, and nonfiction (b. 1930)
 Ken Hendricks, businessman, founded ABC Supply (b. 1941)
 December 23 – Michael Kidd, choreographer (b. 1915) 
 December 31 – Michael Goldberg, American abstract expressionist painter (b. 1924)

See also 
 2007 in American soccer
 2007 in American television
 List of American films of 2007
 Timeline of United States history (1990–2009)

References

External links
 

 
2000s in the United States
United States
United States
Years of the 21st century in the United States